Ayoub Jabbari (born 30 January 2000) is a Moroccan professional footballer who plays as a forward for Spanish club Rayo Cantabria.

Club career
Born in Rabat, Jabbari represented hometown side AS FAR before moving to C'Chartres Football on a trial period in 2019. On 12 February 2020, however, he signed a contract with SM Caen until 2023, being initially assigned to the reserve team in Championnat National 3.

On 14 December 2020, Jabbari was loaned to Championnat National side US Avranches until the end of the season. The following 31 August, he terminated his contract with Caen.

On 2 February 2022, Jabbari moved to Spain and joined Racing de Santander, being assigned to the B-side in Segunda División RFEF. He made his first team debut on 9 October, coming on as a late substitute for Matheus Aiás in a 1–0 Segunda División away win over Levante UD.

Personal life
Jabbari's older brother Ahmed is also a footballer. A midfielder, he also represented Chartres.

References

External links

2000 births
Living people
Moroccan footballers
Footballers from Rabat
Association football forwards
Championnat National players
Stade Malherbe Caen players
US Avranches players
Segunda División players
Segunda Federación players
Rayo Cantabria players
Racing de Santander players
Moroccan expatriate footballers
Expatriate footballers in France
Expatriate footballers in Spain
Moroccan expatriate sportspeople in France
Moroccan expatriate sportspeople in Spain